Anatolian Studies is an annual peer-reviewed academic journal covering the history, archaeology, and social sciences of Turkey and the Black Sea region. It was established in 1951 and is published by Cambridge University Press on behalf of the British Institute at Ankara. The editor-in-chief is Roger Matthews (University of Reading).

Abstracting and indexing 
The journal is abstracted and indexed in:
 L'Année Philologique

External links 

English-language journals
Annual journals
Cambridge University Press academic journals
Publications established in 1951
Area studies journals